Highway 749 is a highway in the Canadian province of Saskatchewan. It runs from Highway 19 near Elbow to Highway 2 near Liberty.

Highway 749 runs eastward from Highway 19, and it almost exclusively intersects minor Township Roads and Range Roads for its entire length. It intersects Highway 627 at km 26, and at km 51, it intersects Highway 11 after passing through the hamlet of Girvin.

See also 
Roads in Saskatchewan
Transportation in Saskatchewan

References 

749